Precious: Based on the Novel Push by Sapphire (usually shortened to Precious) is an American drama film directed by Lee Daniels that was released in 2009. Precious is an adaptation by Geoffrey S. Fletcher of the 1996 novel Push by Sapphire. The film was released by Lions Gate Entertainment on November 6, 2009, in the United States and Canada, grossing over $1.8 million in its opening weekend in limited release, ranking 12th place at the box office. The film grossed over $47,500,000 domestically and $53,400,000 worldwide. Precious was well received by movie critics, with an approval rating of 91% on the review aggregator Rotten Tomatoes, which consists of popular and notable critics reviews from newspapers, websites, television and radio programs.

The film has received various awards and nominations, with the nominations categories mainly ranging from recognition of the film itself (Best Film) to its direction, editing and writing (Best Direction, Best Editing, Best Adapted Screenplay) to the cast's acting performance, mainly Mo'Nique's and Gabourey Sidibe's for Best Supporting Actress and Best Actress, respectively. Precious received three nominations at the 67th Golden Globe Awards ceremony, and received one award for Best Performance By An Actress In A Supporting Role In A Motion Picture. Precious received six nominations from the 82nd Academy Awards ceremony, winning two for Best Supporting Actress and Best Writing for an adapted screenplay. The film also received four nominations at the 63rd British Academy Film Awards, winning Best Supporting Actress. The film won all five of its nominations at the 25th Independent Spirit Awards, for Best Feature, Best First Screenplay, Best Director, Best Female Lead and Best Supporting Female.

Precious received three nominations at the 16th Screen Actors Guild Awards, winning Outstanding Performance by a Female Actor in a Supporting Role. The film won the People's Choice Award, at the 34th Toronto International Film Festival, and Breakthrough Performance by an Actress, at the 81st National Board of Review Awards. The film also won the Special Jury Prize, at the 25th Sundance Film Festival. Precious received two nominations, winning the Stanley Kramer Award, at the 21st Producers Guild of America Awards and won Outstanding Directorial Achievement, 62nd Directors Guild of America Awards. Mo'Nique also received recognition for her performance at 35th LA Film Critics Association Awards, 75th NY Film Critics Circle Awards and 5th Utah Film Critics Association Awards, winning Best Supporting Actress from all three of the organizations. Precious was included in the Top 10 Films of 2009 lists from 18th Southeastern Film Critics Association Awards, 9th NY Film Critics Online, and 16th DFW Film Critics Association.

Awards and nominations

References
General

Specific

External links 
 

Lists of accolades by film